Johannes Gehrts (26 February 1855 St. Pauli – 1921 Düsseldorf), brother of Carl Gehrts (1853–1898), was a leading German illustrator whose work appeared in popular magazines such as Die Gartenlaube, in the design of children's books and in works of his friend Felix Dahn. He depicted scenes from Germanic and Norse mythology, legends and sagas, pirate stories, travel adventures and fairy-tales. He also illustrated reports on the scientific expeditions of the German physician and anthropologist Karl von den Steinen.

Gehrts attended the art academy of Weimar from 1873 to 1876, and lived in Düsseldorf from 1884 onwards.

Gallery

See also
 List of German painters

External links
Collected illustrations from Walhall: Germanische Götter- und Heldensagen' by Felix Dahn and Therese Dahn, 1885.
 

 

1855 births
1921 deaths
German illustrators
19th-century German painters
19th-century German male artists
German male painters
20th-century German painters
20th-century German male artists